Gerrit Fauser (born 13 July 1989) is a German professional ice hockey player currently with the Grizzlys Wolfsburg in the Deutsche Eishockey Liga (DEL). He joined Wolfsburg from DEL rival the Hannover Scorpions.

Career statistics

Regular season and playoffs

International

References

External links
 

1989 births
Living people
Fischtown Pinguins players
Gatineau Olympiques players
German ice hockey centres
Hannover Scorpions players
Kölner Haie players
EV Landshut players
Straubing Tigers players
Grizzlys Wolfsburg players
Ice hockey players at the 2018 Winter Olympics
Medalists at the 2018 Winter Olympics
Olympic ice hockey players of Germany
Olympic medalists in ice hockey
Olympic silver medalists for Germany
Sportspeople from Nuremberg